Peter von Danzig was a 15th-century ship of the Hanseatic League. The three-masted ship was the first large vessel in the Baltic Sea with carvel planking.

Career 
Peter von Danzig was built at the French west coast and originally named Pierre de la Rochelle or Peter van Rosseel. The ship arrived in Danzig in 1462, carrying sea salt from the Atlantic. While she anchored in roadstead, she was damaged by lightning.

The ship lay inactive for a while in Danzig harbour, but was eventually seized and changed over to a warship in 1469 after the Hanse had declared war on England.

Between August 1471 and 1473 Peter von Danzig operated in the North Sea under captain Paul Beneke, hunting English merchantmen with a letter of marque and securing Hanse convoys. After the Treaty of Utrecht (1474), the ship undertook several trade trips abroad, before she appears to have been decommissioned in the late 1470s.

See also 
 List of ships of the Hanseatic League
 Baochuan
 Flor de la Mar
 Jong (ship)

References

Sources 
 Jochen Brennecke: Geschichte der Schiffahrt, Künzelsau 1986 (2nd ed.) , p. 62
 Propyläen Technikgeschichte (Ed. Wolfgang König): Karl-Heinz Ludwig, Volker Schmidtchen: Metalle und Macht. 1000 bis 1600. Berlin, Frankfurt/Main 1992 (2nd ed.)

External links 
 

History of Gdańsk
Hanseatic League
Naval ships of Germany
15th-century ships
Three-masted ships